Peter Linwood Ladd (born July 17, 1956) is an American former professional baseball pitcher. Mainly used as a relief pitcher, Ladd started just one game out of 205 total games pitched. He played collegiately at the University of Mississippi, Oxford.

Career
Ladd was originally drafted by the Boston Red Sox in the 25th round of the 1977 Major League Baseball Draft. He was traded to the Houston Astros in June 1979 as part of a deal for Bob Watson, and made his major league debut for Houston two months later. After spending the next two seasons in the Astros' farm system, Ladd was traded to the Milwaukee Brewers for Rickey Keeton.

He was called up to the majors in July, and posted a 1–3 record with a 4.00 earned run average in 16 games down the stretch. Despite his lack of experience, Ladd was named the Brewers' closer for the 1982 postseason following an injury to Rollie Fingers. He appeared three times (3.1 innings pitched) without giving up a baserunner while notching 5 strikeouts and picked up a pair of saves in the Brewers' win over the California Angels in the ALCS, including pitching the series clinching ground ball to Rod Carew in Game 5. After allowing the go-ahead run to score in relief of Bob McClure in game 2 of the World Series, he did not appear again in a series that went seven games in a loss to the St. Louis Cardinals.

He pitched two more seasons for the Brewers before being released. His final major league season was with the Seattle Mariners in 1986. In , he pitched his last professional season for the Albuquerque Dukes in the Los Angeles Dodgers organization.

References

External links
, or Retrosheet, or Pelota Binaria (Venezuelan Winter League)

1956 births
Living people
Albuquerque Dukes players
American expatriate baseball players in Canada
Baseball players from Maine
Bristol Red Sox players
Cardenales de Lara players
American expatriate baseball players in Venezuela
Columbus Astros players
Houston Astros players
Major League Baseball pitchers
Milwaukee Brewers players
Seattle Mariners players
Sportspeople from Portland, Maine
Tucson Toros players
UMass Minutemen baseball players
Vancouver Canadians players
Winter Haven Red Sox players
Ole Miss Rebels baseball players
Baseball players from Atlanta